Clara Ponsot (born 25 January 1989) is a French actress. She has appeared in more than twenty films since 2006.

Selected filmography

References

External links 

1989 births
Living people
French film actresses
21st-century French actresses
French National Academy of Dramatic Arts alumni